Pine Slash, also known as Prospect Hill, is a historic home located at Studley, Hanover County, Virginia. The main house was built about 1750, and is a one-story dwelling of colonial vertical plank construction with a metal gable roof.  In addition to the main house, the property includes a contributing second residence and a brick outbuilding, both dating from the early 19th century. Pine Slash is also significant as American Founding Father Patrick Henry's home in the 1750s.

It was listed on the National Register of Historic Places in 1987.

References

Houses on the National Register of Historic Places in Virginia
Colonial architecture in Virginia
Houses completed in 1750
Houses in Hanover County, Virginia
National Register of Historic Places in Hanover County, Virginia
Patrick Henry
Homes of United States Founding Fathers